Durrett is a surname. Notable people with the surname include:

Alan Durrett (born 1948), Zambian swimmer
Charles Durrett, American architect and author
Ken Durrett (1948–2001), American professional basketball player
Liz Durrett (born 1978), American singer-songwriter
Red Durrett (1921–1992), American baseball player
Reuben T. Durrett (1824–1913), American lawyer, jurist, linguist, poet, editor, journalist, history writer and bibliographer
Rick Durrett, American mathematician
Sylvana Ward Durrett, American film producer

See also
Durrett Town, Virginia
Durrett-Jarratt House